10,000 Miles is a 2016 Taiwanese sports drama film directed by Simon Hung and starring Sean Huang, Megan Lai, and Darren Wang. The film is executive produced by Jay Chou and ultramarathon runner Kevin Lin.

Cast

 Sean Huang as Kevin Fang
 Megan Lai as Ellie Chou Yi-ching
 Darren Wang as Sean Fang
 Jack Noseworthy as Charlie
 Fan Kuang-yao as The coach who can't stop chewing gum
 Lung Shao-hua as Kevin and Sean's father
 Ken Lo as Evil doctor
 Weng Ning-qian as Evil doctor's assistant
 Liao Chun as Shop owner
 Peng Peng as Shop owner's wife
 Chien Li-wen as Nicole
 Lele as Minnie
 Chris Lee as Ellie's boyfriend
 Hsu Li-yun as Orphanage matron
 Kuo Chih-chia as Kevin Fang (childhood)
 Shen Chang-hung as Sean Fang (childhood)
 Peter Huang as Taxi passenger
 Jay Chou as himself (cameo)
 Wang Tao-nan as Nicole's father
 Chiang Shao-yi as Nicole's mother
 Liya Wang as Female runner

Soundtrack

Featured songs

References

External links

2016 films
Taiwanese-language films
2010s Mandarin-language films
2010s English-language films
Taiwanese romantic drama films
2016 romantic drama films
Taiwanese sports drama films
Running films
2010s sports drama films
Films set in the 1990s
Films shot in Utah
Films shot in Taiwan
2016 multilingual films
Taiwanese multilingual films
English-language Taiwanese films